Ausa Taluka is a taluka, administrative subdivision, of Latur District in Maharashtra, India.  The administrative center for the taluka is the town of Ausa. In the 2011 census there were 108 panchayat villages in Ausa Taluka.

Geography 
Ausa Taluka has an average elevation of 634 metres (2080 feet). Among the major revenue circle villages are: Almala, Ujani, Bhada, Lamjana, Killari and Matola. Geographically the area of Bhada is bigger  in the Ausa Taluka.

Demographics
In 2011 the total population of Ausa Taluka was 309,846 up from 275,247 in 2001.

Notes

External links
 

Ausa